Aldo Nova is the debut album by Canadian musician Aldo Nova, released in 1982. It reached number 8 on the Billboard 200 and was certified Gold by the RIAA on May 14, 1982, Platinum on February 14, 1989, and Double Platinum on December 5, 1994. Both of the singles released from the album charted on the Hot 100, "Foolin' Yourself" at No. 65 and "Fantasy" at No. 23.

Due to the fact that he only had one top 40 hit in America, Aldo Nova is typically categorized as a one-hit wonder; for example, "Fantasy" was listed at No. 77 on VH1's list of the 100 greatest '80s one-hit wonders.

Release, reception and legacy 

Released on April 1 in 1982, to commercial success, this album stands as Nova's most commercially successful to date. After the album was released, Aldo purposely avoided the spotlight and tried to stay out of the public eye.

AllMusic's Bret Adams gave the album 4 and 1/2 stars and said that, "Aldo Nova doesn't get enough credit for helping invent the 1980s pop-metal genre, which focused equally on hard rocking anthems and soaring power ballads".

For the 35th anniversary of Aldo Nova's debut, he re-recorded 6 tracks of this album and gave it a more modern touch.

Track listing 
All songs written by Aldo Nova.
Side one
 "Fantasy" – 5:05
 "Hot Love" – 3:54
 "It's Too Late" – 3:23
 "Ball and Chain" – 4:01
 "Heart to Heart" – 3:42

Side two
 "Foolin' Yourself" – 3:35
 "Under the Gun" – 3:47
 "You're My Love" – 3:33
 "Can't Stop Lovin' You" – 3:57
 "See the Light" –3:56

Recent remastered/reissued versions of the album feature a demo of "Foolin' Yourself" as a bonus track.

Personnel 
 Aldo Nova - vocals, lead and rhythm guitars, bass guitar, keyboards, synthesizers
 Dennis Chartrand - acoustic piano
 Michel Pelo, Roberto Biagioni - bass guitar
 Michael LaChapelle, Terry Martell - drums, percussion
 Daniel Barbe, Dwight Druck - backing vocals

Production
Executive Producers: Lennie Petze, Val Azzoli
Produced by Aldo Nova
Recorded By Aldo Nova, Billy Szawlowski & Louis Mercier (at Bobinason Studios & Kingdom Sound)
Mixed By Aldo Nova, Tony Bongiovi & Ray "We Don't Know What You Do" Willard (at The Power Station)
Mastered by Bob Ludwig
All Songs Published By ATV Music.

Charts

Weekly charts

Certifications and sales

References

External links 
 Aldo Nova at Discogs

Aldo Nova albums
1982 debut albums
Albums produced by Aldo Nova
Portrait Records albums